Henry Augustus Sims (1832 – 1875) was a Philadelphia architect of the 19th century.

Biography

He was born in Philadelphia, Pennsylvania on December 22, 1832, the second son of John Clarke Sims and Emeline Marion Clark.

He was educated at the Philadelphia high school; training in civil engineering.  In 1851 he moved to Canada and was employed by Bytown and Prescott Railways for the construction of railroads.  In 1856 he changed his profession to architecture.  In 1858 in Ottawa, Canada he had a successful architectural business.  He returned to Philadelphia in 1866 and continued to have a successful architectural business. He was joined by his younger brother, James Peacock Sims, and together they established the H.A. & J.P. Sims firm which functioned successfully until his death in 1875.    An auction catalogue of his valuable collection of architectural books survives.

He mentored architects Thomas Roney Williamson and James Peacock Sims. He was a member of the American Institute of Architects, the Philadelphia chapter of the AIA, and the Philadelphia Sketch Club.

He died in Philadelphia, Pennsylvania on July 10, 1875.

Selected works

United States
  Township Hall, (1858), Augusta Township, Northampton County, Pennsylvania.
 St. John's Chapel (1865–66), Washington & Franklin Streets, Cape May, New Jersey. Now known as Episcopal Church of the Advent.
 First Presbyterian Church in Philadelphia (1868–72), 21st & Walnut Streets, Philadelphia, Pennsylvania.
 Washington County Court House (1872), Hagerstown, Maryland. 
  Second Girard Avenue Bridge (1873–74, demolished 1969), Fairmount Park, Philadelphia, Pennsylvania, Thomas C. Clark, engineer.
  Masonic Hall, (1875), Reading, Pennsylvania.
  Chapel, Mercersburg, Pennsylvania.
  Montgomery County Almshouse, Norristown, Pennsylvania.

Canada
  Edwardsburgh Township Hall, (1858), Spencerville, Ont;
  Cemetery Monument for Rev. Robert Blakey, (1860), Prescott, Ont
  Monument for G.E. Aird, (1864) Ottawa, Ont.
  Cottage for Brandish Billings Sr., (1864), Ottawa, Ont
  Skating Arena & Curling Rink (major addition), (1864), Ottawa, Ont
  Cottage at Ashburnham Hill for Charles King, (1864), Ottawa, Ont
  Commercial buildings for Mr. Prodrick, Sussex Street (1865) Ottawa, Ont.
  Anglican Church, (1865-1867), Iroquois, Ont.
  Residence at New Edinburgh for Robert Blackburn, (1867), Ottawa, Ont
  Anglican Church for Rev. E.W. Beaven, (1868), Edwardsburgh, Ont

References

1832 births
1875 deaths
Architects from Philadelphia
19th-century American architects